Lance Cox (11 October 1933 – 31 January 2016) was an Australian rules footballer who played with Richmond in the Victorian Football League (VFL).

Notes

External links 		
		

		
		
		

1933 births
2016 deaths
Australian rules footballers from Tasmania
Richmond Football Club players
Glenorchy Football Club players